State of Things is a 1995 Romanian drama film directed by Stere Gulea. The film was selected as the Romanian entry for the Best Foreign Language Film at the 69th Academy Awards, but was not accepted as a nominee.

Cast
 Oana Pellea as Alberta Costineanu
 Mircea Rusu as Andrei Secosan
 Dan Condurache as Petrache Maxentiu
 Razvan Vasilescu as Officer Muresan
 Serban Celea as Officer Cretu
 Luminita Gheorghiu as Muresan's wife
 Mara Grigore as Nurse from TV station
 Cornel Scripcaru as Major Leo
 Silviu Stanculescu as Maxentiu's father

See also
 List of submissions to the 69th Academy Awards for Best Foreign Language Film
 List of Romanian submissions for the Academy Award for Best Foreign Language Film

References

External links
 

1995 films
1995 drama films
Romanian drama films
1990s Romanian-language films